Marit Elisabeth Maij (born 16 January 1972) is a Dutch politician and former management consultant, diplomat as well as civil servant. She was a member of the House of Representatives for the Labour Party between 20 September 2012 and 23 March 2017.

Early life and education
Marit Elisabeth Maij was born on 16 January 1972 in Apeldoorn in the Netherlands. She is the daughter of Christian Democratic Appeal politician Hanja Maij-Weggen.

During her late teens she was president of LAKS, an association of Dutch pupils.

Maij studied political science at the University of Amsterdam, obtained an MBA from the European University, and studied at the Open University of Catalonia.

Career
Maij worked as an assistant to the CDA parliamentary group in the European Parliament, at the Ministry of Foreign Affairs, at the embassies in Costa Rica and Beijing, and as an advisor to several other Dutch Ministries.

House of Representatives
As a member of the Labour Party (Partij van de Arbeid) Maij was a member of the House of Representatives between 20 September 2012 and 23 March 2017. In parliament, she served on the Committee on Foreign Affairs, the Defence Committee, the Committee on European Affairs and the Committee on Foreign Trade and Development Cooperation.

In addition to her role in parliament, Maij served as member of the Dutch delegation to the Parliamentary Assembly of the Council of Europe between 2016 and 2017. She was the First Vice-Chairperson of the Committee on Equality and Non-Discrimination; a member of the Committee on the Honouring of Obligations and Commitments by Member States of the Council of Europe (Monitoring Committee); and a member of the Committee on Migration, Refugees and Displaced Persons. Between 2016 and 2017, she prepared the Assembly’s proposal on measures to prevent and combat online hate.

References

External links 

  Marit Maij at the website of the Labour Party
  Marit Maij at the website of the House of Representatives

1972 births
Living people
21st-century Dutch politicians
21st-century Dutch women politicians
Dutch civil servants
Dutch expatriates in China
Dutch expatriates in Costa Rica
Dutch management consultants
Dutch women diplomats
21st-century Dutch diplomats
Labour Party (Netherlands) politicians
Members of the House of Representatives (Netherlands)
People from Apeldoorn
University of Amsterdam alumni